Guancheng may refer to:

Guancheng Hui District (管城回族区), Zhengzhou
Guancheng District, Dongguan (莞城区), Guangdong
Guancheng, Pingnan County, Guangxi (官成镇), town
Guancheng, Guan County (冠城镇), town in Shandong
Guancheng, Shen County (观城镇), town in Shandong
Sichuan Guancheng, Chinese Football Association Jia A League and Chinese Super League Club
Fang Guancheng, a Chinese Noble and high government official of the Qing Dynasty